Robert Bass (born 1948) is an American businessman and philanthropist.

Robert Bass may also refer to:

 Robert Bass (conductor) (1953–2008), American music director and conductor
 Robert P. Bass (1873–1960), American farmer, forestry expert, and Republican politician from New Hampshire
 Robert Wilton Bass (1921–1998), politician from Texas
 Bob Bass (1929–2018), American basketball coach and executive
 Robert William Bass (1804–1875), English artist